Robert Michael Rinder  (born 31 May 1978) better known as Judge Rinder, is a British  criminal barrister and television personality. In 2014, while still a practising barrister, he began hosting the reality courtroom series Judge Rinder. In 2019, he also began hosting the Channel 4 series The Rob Rinder Verdict.

In 2022, Rinder also became a regular host on ITV’s Good Morning Britain.

Early life
Rinder was born in London on 31 May 1978 into a Jewish family;   his mother is Angela Cohen, chair of the 45 Aid Society. He was brought up in Southgate and was educated at Malet Lambert and the National Youth Theatre. Rinder later gave up acting because his peer and later close friend, Benedict Cumberbatch, "was so good". Rinder studied politics and modern history at the University of Manchester, graduating with first-class honours.

Career

Legal
Rinder was called to the bar in 2001 after graduating from the University of Manchester, starting his pupillage at 2 Paper Buildings. He then became a tenant at 2 Hare Court. He went on to specialise in cases involving international fraud, money laundering and other forms of financial crime. He was involved in prosecutions following the murders of Leticia Shakespeare and Charlene Ellis in January 2003, and the defence of British servicemen on charges of manslaughter after the deaths of detainees in Iraq. Since 2010, he has been involved in the investigation and prosecution of alleged bribery, corruption, and fraud in the British Overseas Territory of the Turks and Caicos Islands.

Television
While practising as a barrister, Rinder wrote television scripts in his spare time. Upon attempting to sell one, he met producer Tom McLennan. He approached ITV with a proposal for a remake of the 1970s programme Crown Court, but this was rejected in favour of a British version of Judge Judy, and  McLennan offered Rinder the opportunity to front it. Since 2014, he has been the eponymous judge in the reality courtroom series Judge Rinder, where he has been referred to as a British Judge Judy.

Shortly after the programme started, he criticised Judith Sheindlin, the judge of Judge Judy, for making judgements based on her preconceptions while claiming that he applied the law seriously and made "real legal rulings". Despite this, he insisted that it be clarified on the programme that he is a practising criminal law barrister and not a civil court judge. As such, he wears his normal barrister's court dress but without the barrister's wig. Rinder received praise for his cross-examination abilities and acerbic comments. His courtroom includes a gavel and flag of the United Kingdom, neither of which is used in British courts but are on display in American courts and televised court programmes, and his show has been criticised as "The Jeremy Kyle Show set in a small-claims court".

In 2015, Rinder released a book called Rinder Rules. In 2016, he presented a new series, Judge Rinder's Crime Stories, with reconstructions of real crimes. He also hosted Raising the Bar on BBC Radio 5 Live, which he started with a discussion with former Lord Chief Justice, Lord Judge. In December 2017, Rinder re-launched Crown Court on ITV, newly named Judge Rinder's Crown Court, with a two-part special after a 30-year hiatus.

From September 2016, Rinder competed in the fourteenth series of Strictly Come Dancing, stating that he was doing so to make his grandmother proud of him. Rinder was partnered with Ukrainian-born professional dancer Oksana Platero. Rinder was eliminated in week 11 after scoring 31 points dancing a Samba to "Oh, What a Night". He ended the competition in fifth place.

In an episode of Who Do You Think You Are? broadcast on 13 August 2018, Rinder traced his Jewish family's tragic history and made new discoveries about his grandfather, Morris Malenicky, a survivor of both Schlieben and Theresienstadt concentration camps.

In December 2018, Rinder hosted Good Year Bad Year, a one-off special on Channel 4  where Rinder discussed the topical highs and lows of 2018 along with a number of celebrity guests. In 2019, he began hosting the Channel 4 series The Rob Rinder Verdict.

In July 2020, Rinder appeared on series 2 of Celebrity Gogglebox alongside Susanna Reid.

In November 2020, Rinder released My Family, the Holocaust and Me for BBC One; a documentary which helped Jewish families discover the full truth about what happened to their relatives during the Holocaust. The documentary received widespread acclaim, and "a vital history lesson".

Rinder has been presenting on Good Morning Britain on ITV in 2022.

On 14 July 2022, Crime & Investigation UK commissioned the 10-part crime series Rob Rinder’s Interrogation Secrets; presented by Rinder, the series premiered on 4 September 2022.

In November 2022, it was announced that Rob Rinder would join chef Monica Galetti as the new co-host of Amazing Hotels: Life Beyond The Lobby.

In March 2023, Rinder released The Holy Land and Us: Our Untold Stories for BBC Two; a two-part documentary exploring the personal stories of families of Jewish and Palestinian heritage.

Radio
Between July and August 2021, Rinder presented a six part series on Classic FM, titled Robert Rinder’s Classical Passions. As of October 2021, Rinder is the new permanent host of Drivetime every Friday on talkRADIO and talkRADIO TV.

In 2022, Rinder travelled to the Polish-Ukraine border to report on the crisis for talkRADIO.

Writing 
In 2014, Rinder started to write a legal-based discussion column in the newspaper The Sun, and in 2015, he released a book called Rinder Rules. Rinder became a columnist for the London Evening Standard in 2017.

Charitable work 
Rinder is the patron of Buttle UK and, in this capacity, has run The London Marathon, as well as launching The Italian Job 2018 at The NEC, Birmingham on 10 November 2017.

Personal life
Rinder entered into a same-sex civil partnership with barrister Seth Cumming at a ceremony on the island of Ibiza in 2013, conducted by Rinder's friend, actor Benedict Cumberbatch. Cumberbatch was legally entitled to conduct the ceremony because of his online Universal Life Church ministerial ordination and Rinder was later one of three best men at Cumberbatch's wedding to Sophie Hunter in 2015. It was reported in January 2018 that Rinder and Cumming had separated.

Rinder was appointed Member of the Order of the British Empire (MBE) in the 2021 Birthday Honours for services to Holocaust education and awareness.

References

External links
 
 Robert Rinder at Biogs.com

1978 births
Living people
20th-century English Jews
21st-century English Jews
Alumni of the University of Manchester
English barristers
English legal writers
English television personalities
British LGBT entertainers
English LGBT people
LGBT Jews
Members of the Order of the British Empire
National Youth Theatre members
People educated at Queen Elizabeth's Grammar School for Boys
People from Westminster
Television judges
Television personalities from London